The War Museum of Kalpaki is a museum in Kalpaki, Ioannina, Greece, dedicated to the Greco-Italian War of 1940–1941.

External links
 Military Museum of Kalpaki
 Article in newspaper To Vima (in Greek)

World War II museums in Greece
Museums in Ioannina (regional unit)